Coleotechnites quercivorella is a moth of the family Gelechiidae. It is found in North America, where it has been recorded from Alabama, Alberta, British Columbia, California, Illinois, Kentucky, Maine, Maryland, Massachusetts, Minnesota, New Brunswick, New Hampshire, New Jersey, North Dakota, Ohio, Oklahoma, Ontario, Pennsylvania, Quebec, South Carolina, Tennessee, Texas and West Virginia.

The wingspan is about 11 mm. The forewings are whitish, dusted and mottled with dark grey to blackish. The hindwings are pale.

The larvae feed on Quercus species.

References

Moths described in 1872
Coleotechnites